Duncan Rouleau is an American comic book writer and artist, and is a part of the Man of Action Studios collective of creators (along with Joe Casey, Joe Kelly, Steven T. Seagle), who created the series Ben 10, that aired on Cartoon Network.

Career
Rouleau has illustrated a variety of popular American comic books for Dark Horse Comics, DC Comics, Image Comics, Marvel Comics, and other publishers. He illustrated and co-wrote the 8-issue miniseries of The Metal Men in 2007 by DC Comics. Steven T. Seagle and Rouleau also created the Marvel Comics super-hero team Big Hero 6.

In 2001, Rouleau co-founded Man of Action Entertainment, a creative think tank and production house, along with fellow partners and comic book creators Joe Casey, Joe Kelly, and Steven T. Seagle. MAN OF ACTION scripted four short films for an independent producer before being tapped to write the script for Activision's highly successful X-Men: Legends video game. Their third professional credit was the original animation series Ben 10 which they created and sold to Cartoon Network. The original series ran for 52 episodes and has so far spawned sequel series Ben 10: Alien Force, Ben 10: Ultimate Alien, two live action made-for TV-movies, and a live stage show. Their second original creation for Cartoon Network, Generator Rex, has aired over forty episodes to date, launched a merchandise line, and crossed over with Ben 10 in 2011. Rouleau serves as the co-executive producer on Ultimate Spider-Man on Disney XD, which premiered in April 2012. In 2013, Rouleau also serves as co-executive producer on Disney XD's Avengers Assemble). The 2014 Disney animated film Big Hero 6 is based on the Marvel Comics team co-created by Rouleau.

In 2006, Rouleau released his first original graphic novel, The Nightmarist, published by Active Images.

In 2016, Rouleau served as the creator of the Ben 10 reboot.

He is currently one of the writers on the upcoming 2022 Netflix 3D animated series Sonic Prime.

Bibliography

Notes

References

External links

Man of Action Website

Place of birth missing (living people)
Year of birth missing (living people)
Living people
American comics artists
Man of Action Studios